"Wasted" is a song by American rapper and singer Juice Wrld featuring fellow American rapper and singer Lil Uzi Vert. It was released on July 10, 2018 before being added to the former's debut studio album Goodbye & Good Riddance, which was released earlier in May 2018 with Uzi as the only feature of the album. It premiered on Apple Music's Beats 1.

Reception 
The video game series Grand Theft Auto is referenced in the song, as is its developers, Rockstar Games, as HotNewHipHop described the reference as "a charming play on the message that pops up when you die in Grand Theft Auto" games. Uzi Vert's verse is described as distorted, and stated by Rap-Up as a "rapid-fire verse" on which they reference "molly, hakuna matata, and a dominatrix."

Composition 
The meaning of the song is stated as "Juice getting vulnerable about a partner who's trying to 'get closer to Satan' by talking to him 'in the Matrix'" and "tackling the duality of drug culture, one where users are aware of their own demons but keep coming back for one reason or another." The song is described as "melancholic, shoegaze-y and dispirited." It reflects on consuming drugs with girls who make both Higgins and Woods sad. Compared to the musical style of American rapper Post Malone, it is noted for its "jaded and new age pop sound." The song consists of a "heavy trap beat."

Track listing

Charts

Certifications

Release history

References 

Lil Uzi Vert songs
Juice Wrld songs
2018 singles
Songs written by Lil Uzi Vert
Songs written by Juice Wrld
2018 songs
Songs about drugs
Music based on video games
Interscope Records singles